Michelle Jackson-Nobrega (born 28 December 1973) is a former professional tennis player from the United States.

Biography
Born in Brazil, Jackson-Nobrega moved back and forth between the United States and her birth country as a child, before her family settled permanently in Florida in the mid 1980s. She attended Cardinal Newman High School in West Palm Beach.

Jackson-Nobrega reached a best singles ranking of 108 in the world while competing on the professional tour in the 1990s. Her best WTA Tour performance came at the 1994 Lipton Championships in Miami, where she had wins over Caroline Kuhlman and Stephanie Rottier, then took seventh seed Lindsay Davenport to three sets in a third round loss. She made a grand slam main draw appearance at 1994 US Open, partnering Åsa Carlsson in the doubles.

She represented the United States in tennis at the World Outgames in 2017.

ITF finals

Singles: 3 (2–1)

Doubles: 5 (3–2)

References

External links
 
 

1973 births
Living people
American female tennis players
LGBT tennis players
American LGBT sportspeople
Lesbian sportswomen
Brazilian emigrants to the United States
Tennis people from Florida
21st-century American women